Richard Walters is an English singer, songwriter and multi-instrumentalist. He was born in Oxford.

Career
Walters fronted a number of bands in his teens before signing to Warner Chappell Music Publishing as frontman of Theremin in 2001. The band released one double A-side single—"In the Barn/Minor Planets"—through Oxford 'singles club' label Shifty Disco in 2001, before disbanding in late 2002. Walters was then taken on as a solo artist by both Warner Chappell Music and Radiohead's Courtyard Management in 2003, recording the Umbrella Songs EP at the companies' Oxfordshire studios in 2004. The EP gained critical support on both sides of the Atlantic, catching the ear of KCRW presenter Nic Harcourt, who repeatedly played tracks from the EP on his Morning Becomes Eclectic show. "All at Sea", a short 2-minute piano-led track from the EP, was used in a closing scene of American television show CSI: Miami in 2005.

Walters was diagnosed with epilepsy in 2005 and took a break from writing and recording. He eventually returned to the studio in 2006 and released the resulting Guy Sigsworth (Frou Frou, Madonna, Björk) produced Pilotlights EP in 2007 on British label Big Scary Monsters.

Releases

2008–2011: The Animal and Pacing
Walters signed with London record label Kartel in 2008, putting out several singles before releasing the (partly) David Kosten produced album The Animal in 2009. The album was met with critical acclaim and strong radio support in the United Kingdom, with several songs being placed in prominent American television shows including So You Think You Can Dance? and Grey's Anatomy. Chrysalis Music Publishing signed Walters in early 2010. Walters moved to Paris around this time.

In late summer 2010 Walters began writing with songwriter, producer and Britpop guitarist Bernard Butler (notable for co-writing the first two albums by Suede and his work with Duffy) and The Cranberries guitarist Noel Hogan, the result was the 10-track album 'Pacing' released in spring 2011. The album, a guitar heavy record, was a departure from Walters' signature ethereal sound and received mixed reviews.

2011–2013: Young Trees, Regret Less and Two Birds
Moving back to the United Kingdom in early 2011, Walters began writing new songs, self-releasing a download-only EP of 'sketches' in December 2011 entitled Young Trees. A full-length album, Regret Less, was released in October 2012. The album received critical praise throughout Europe and a number of songs from the album (and EP) were placed on American TV shows including Revenge, Criminal Minds and Private Practice. Walters toured extensively in support of the album.

In August 2013, Walters released a new four track EP, Two Birds.

In late 2015 Walters recorded a cover of the Peter, Bjorn & John song 'Young Folks', which featured in the Christmas advertising campaign for Polish soft drinks brand Tymbark.

2016 – 2019: A.M. 
Walters released the 11-track album A.M. on his own label, Pilotlights Music, in October 2016. Produced by Aidan O'Brien, the album includes the song 'July Bones', which featured on an episode of US TV show Bones. The album received notable support from BBC Radio 2 DJ Dermot O'Leary and BBC 6 Music DJ Lauren Laverne. Following the album, Walters released a number of stand-alone digital singles, including 'Nervous Energy', 'This Fire', 'Already Home' & 'I Won't'. These songs featured on TV shows including Station 19, Queen Sugar, Magnum PI and Grey's Anatomy.

2020 - Present: Golden Veins 
Walters signed to UK label Cooking Vinyl in late 2019. His fifth album Golden Veins was announced soon after, with lead single This is Where it Ends receiving a digital release in November 2019. The album was eventually released in June 2020. A track from the album, The Dawn Chorus on Tape, featured on a November 2019 episode of Grey's Anatomy. Produced by Patrick Pearson, the album title was inspired by Japanese art-form Kintsugi.

Collaborations and side projects
Walters has collaborated with The Cranberries guitarist and songwriter Noel Hogan a number of times since 2005, first appearing on Hogan's Mono Band album, and later as part of the Arkitekt project.

In 2007 Walters co-wrote and performed the track 'Cool is the Night' for the 'Between Voices' album by Anti Atlas, a studio project by Radiohead manager Chris Hufford and classical composer Ned Bigham.

In 2010, Walters co-wrote several songs with Grammy Award-winning singer/songwriter Joe Henry, one of which – 'Eyes Out For You' –  featured on Henry's 2011 album 'Reverie'.

Walters collaborated with American house producer Morgan Page in 2011, two tracks 'The Actor' and 'Light Years', appearing on Page's 2012 'In the Air' album.

In 2014 Walters launched a new band project called Liu Bei, releasing one single ('Infatuation' b/w 'Atlas World') on UK label Trangressive in July 2014.

Walters is a member of the UK band LYR, alongside current UK poet laureate Simon Armitage and producer Patrick Pearson. The band released their debut album 'Call in the Crash Team' in summer 2020 via Decca Records imprint Mercury KX. During the Covid-19 UK lockdown in spring 2020, the band released a collaborative single with English actress Florence Pugh entitled 'Lockdown', raising funds for domestic abuse charity Refuge. In 2021, the band released a single called "Winter Solstice" which featured Wendy Smith from Prefab Sprout.

Since 2015 Walters has co-written songs with a number of artists, including Declan J. Donovan, 3LAU, Semisonic, Alison Moyet, Way Out West, Sultan + Shepard and Apocalyptica.

In November 2022, Walters and Canadian electronic artist Jeff Hartford, better known as Attlas, announced a collaborative project called Sun Lo. The duo released their first single "Factory Gates" later that month.

Discography

Albums

Notable EPs/Singles

References

External links

1982 births
Living people
musicians from Oxford
English male singer-songwriters
English session musicians
21st-century English singers
21st-century British male singers